Hu Zhigang (Chinese: 胡之刚; 29 February 1944 – ) is a Chinese football coach and a former international goalkeeper. As a player he represented Shanghai football team while internationally he played for the Chinese national football team in the 1976 AFC Asian Cup.

Playing career
Hu Zhigang was born in Shanghai, he began his football career in 1959, the year Hu Zhigang joined Shanghai Youth Football team. In 1965, Hu Zhigang was selected to the senior Shanghai football team and represented Shanghai win the runners up of 1965 National Games of China. in the same year, Hu Zhigang was called up to China national football team. Hu Zhigang played for China in the 1976 AFC Asian Cup. Hu Zhigang retired in 1976.

Coaching career
After retiring as a player, Hu Zhigang worked as assistant coach of China national football team from 1978 to 1990. From 1994 to 1995,Hu Zhigang worked as coach of Shenzhen F.C., on 1996, he worked as coach of Shanghai Yuyuan. on 1997, Hu Zhigang worked as coach of Jiangsu Gige. In 1999, Hu Zhigang worked as coach of Wuhan Hongtao K. In 2000, Hu Zhigang worked as coach of Bayi. on 2004, Hu Zhigang worked as coach of Xi'an Anxinyuan, but after they faced two loss and one draw after 2004 China League One began, Hu Zhigang resigned.

References

External links
Team China Stats

1944 births
Living people
Chinese footballers
Chinese football managers
1976 AFC Asian Cup players
China international footballers
Association football goalkeepers
Footballers from Shanghai
Shanghai Shenhua F.C. players
Shenzhen F.C. managers
Jiangsu F.C. managers